N'Heures Souris Rames (Nursery Rhymes) is a book of homophonic translations from English to French, published in 1980 by Ormonde de Kay. It contains some forty nursery rhymes, among which are Coucou doux de Ledoux (Cock-A-Doodle-Doo), Signe, garçon. Neuf Sikhs se pansent (Sing a Song of Sixpence) and Hâte, carrosse bonzes (Hot Cross Buns).

Below is de Kay's Georgie Porgie in the original English with the translation into French:

Each poem is accompanied by a series of footnotes, ostensibly explaining obscure terms and references in the French, which parody the scholarly footnotes of philological texts.

See also
 Anguish Languish (1956)
 Mots d'Heures (1967)
 Homophonic translation
 Mondegreen
 Phono-semantic matching

References

Homophonic translation
1980 books
Collections of nursery rhymes